Samuel Dickenson Nxumalo (1926 – 7 March 2015) was the third and last Chief Minister of Gazankulu, a former bantustan in apartheid-era South Africa. He served as Chief Minister from 1 April 1993 to 26 April 1994, when the bantustan was re-integrated into Transvaal.

Early life
Nxumalo was born at Gijana Village in 1926. He was born into a junior house of the Ndwandwe clan, direct descendants of warrior King Nghunghunyane (Gungunhana), the last lion of Gaza.

References

1926 births
2015 deaths
Gazankulu
Gazankulu, Chief Ministers